Onfim (Old Novgorodian: онѳиме, Onfime; also Anthemius of Novgorod) was a Novgorodian boy who lived in Novgorod (present-day Russia) in the 13th century, some time around 1220 or 1260. He left his notes and homework exercises scratched in soft birch bark which was preserved in the clay soil of Novgorod. Onfim, who was most likely six or seven at the time, wrote in the Old Novgorodian dialect of Old East Slavic. Besides letters and syllables, he drew "battle scenes and drawings of himself and his teacher".

Background 
Novgorod, now known as Veliky Novgorod, is the important administrative center of the Novgorod Oblast. At the time Onfim lived, it was the capital of the Novgorod Republic. Scholars believe that the Novgorod Republic had an unusually high level of literacy for the time, with literacy apparently widespread throughout different classes and among both sexes. Since 1951, more than 1100 pieces of birch bark with writing on it have been found, and more are dug up every summer.

In Russia, birch bark manuscripts are called  ("birch bark",), and the academic field that studies them is called berestology.

Onfim's writings 

Onfim left seventeen known birch bark items. Twelve of those have illustrations, five only text. One of the drawings features a knight on a horse, with Onfim's name written next to him, stabbing someone on the ground with a lance, with scholars speculating that Onfim pictured himself as the knight. The writings are clearly learning exercises: Onfim practiced by writing out the alphabet, repeating syllables, and writing psalms—texts that were presumably familiar to him. His writing includes phrases such as "Lord, help your servant Onfim" and fragments from Psalms 6:2 and 27:3. Most of Onfim's writing consists of citations from the Book of Psalms.

Onfim's illustrations include pictures of knights, horses, arrows, and slain enemies. One image, "a portrait of himself, disguised as a fantastic animal", is found on item 199 (pictured above; it was originally the bottom of a basket made of birch bark), which contains a picture of a beast with a long neck, pointy ears, and a curly tail. The beast either has an arrow with feathers in its mouth or is spewing fire; one of the accompanying texts (the one below the box) says "I am a wild beast" (the text in the box says "Greetings from Onfim to Danilo”, likely a friend or classmate of Onfim). The number of fingers on the pictured people's hands varies from three to eight; Onfim had yet to learn how to count.

The rows of five letters each on the other side of 199 are an alphabet exercise. On item 205 (not pictured in this article), Onfim wrote the Cyrillic alphabet and added "On[f]", for his name, in the middle; below that alphabet is what some researchers see as a boat with oars. Item 206 contains alphabetic exercises and "'portraits' of little Onfim and his friends".

Gallery

Notes

References

External links 

 Website, contains catalog of all beretsy found in Novgorod, in Russian
 Blog post by Erik Kwakkel, medieval book historian

13th-century Russian people
People from medieval Novgorod
Russian children
Child artists
Medieval Russian artists
13th-century artists
Old East Slavic